Erika "Elke" Felten (born 13 July 1943) is a West German sprint canoer who competed in the mid-1960s. She finished fourth in the K-1 500 m event at the 1964 Summer Olympics in Tokyo while competing for the United Team of Germany, and won a silver medal in the K-4 500 m event at the 1963 ICF Canoe Sprint World Championships in Jajce.

References

Sports-reference.com profile

1943 births
Canoeists at the 1964 Summer Olympics
West German female canoeists
Living people
Olympic canoeists of the United Team of Germany
ICF Canoe Sprint World Championships medalists in kayak